Alyas Robin Hood (International title: Bow of Justice / ) is a Philippine television drama action crime series broadcast by GMA Network. The series was inspired by the English folk hero, Robin Hood. Directed by Dominic Zapata, it stars Dingdong Dantes in the title role. It premiered on September 19, 2016 on the network's Telebabad line up replacing Descendants of the Sun. The series concluded on November 24, 2017 with a total of 2 seasons and 190 episodes. It was replaced by Kambal, Karibal in its timeslot.

The series is streaming online on YouTube.

Premise
In season 1, Pepe's father is murdered by Dean Balbuena who gets Pepe framed up for the murder. Arrested and later fleeing, Pepe goes out to be "Alyas Robin Hood". Pepe sets to find justice and seeks for the truth to prove himself not guilty for his charges.

In season 2, Pepe is now a lawyer and also engaged to Venus. Their relationship faces a setback due to an accident that involves Pepe's mother. Leading to a new enemy and problems, "Alyas Robin Hood" makes a comeback.

Episodes

Cast and characters 

Lead cast
 Dingdong Dantes as Jose Paulo "Pepe" de Jesus Jr. / Alyas Robin Hood

Supporting cast
 Andrea Torres as Venus Torralba-de Jesus 
 Megan Young as Sarri Acosta (season 1)
 Cherie Gil as Margarita "Maggie" Balbuena (season 1)
 Sid Lucero as Dean Balbuena (season 1)
 Jaclyn Jose as Judy de Jesus
 Christopher De Leon as Jose Paulo de Jesus (season 1)
 Paolo Contis as Daniel Acosta
 Gary Estrada as Carlos "Caloy" de Jesus
 Dennis Padilla as Wilson Chan
 John Feir as Armando
 Gio Alvarez as Jericho "Jekjek" Sumilang
 Lindsay de Vera as Felizidad "Lizzy" de Jesus
 Dave Bornea as Julian Balbuena
 Caprice Cayetano as Ekay
 Rey "PJ" Abellana as Leandro Torralba
 Antonette Garcia as Frida
 Luri Vincent Nalus as Junior "Jun Jun" Aguilar
 Ruru Madrid as Andres Silang (season 2)
 Solenn Heussaff as Iris Rebecca Lizeralde (season 2)
 Edu Manzano as Emilio Albano (season 2)
 Jay Manalo as Pablo Rodrigo (season 2)
 KC Montero as Rigor (season 2)

Ratings
According to AGB Nielsen Philippines' Mega Manila household television ratings, the series premiere of Alyas Robin Hood earned a 21.3% rating. The first season had its highest rating on November 10, 2016 with a 26.2% rating. While from AGB Nielsen Nationwide Urban Television Audience Measurement, the series had its highest rating on December 7, 2016 with a 23.3% rating. The season one's finale scored a 21.3% rating.

According to AGB Nielsen Philippines' Nationwide Urban Television Audience Measurement People in television homes, the premiere of Alyas Robin Hood’s second season earned a 10.7% rating. While the final episode scored a 9.7% rating.

Accolades

References

External links
 
 
 

2016 Philippine television series debuts
2017 Philippine television series endings
Filipino-language television shows
GMA Network drama series
Philippine action television series
Philippine crime television series
Robin Hood television series
Serial drama television series
Superhero television series
Television shows set in Quezon City